Erastus Corning 2nd (October 7, 1909 – May 28, 1983) was an American politician. A Democrat, Corning served as the 72nd mayor of Albany, New York from 1942 to 1983, when Albany County was controlled by one of the last classic urban political machines in the United States.

Corning hailed from a prominent Albany family. His great-grandfather, Erastus Corning, was an industrialist who founded the New York Central Railroad and served in Congress and as Albany's mayor from 1834 to 1837. Another great-grandfather, Amasa J. Parker, was a member of Congress and prominent judge.  Corning's father, Edwin Corning, was Lieutenant Governor of New York from 1927 to 1928.  His uncle, Parker Corning, served as a member of the United States House of Representatives.  His brother, Edwin Corning Jr. served as a member of the New York State Assembly.  Corning was educated at The Albany Academy, Groton School, and Yale University (class of 1932).  The Corning family was involved in several Albany-area businesses, and Corning started an insurance agency after his college graduation.  While he served as mayor, his agency did not do business with the city of Albany, but did do business with Albany County, which Corning argued presented no conflict of interest, since he was not a county official.

Corning's father was one of the leaders of the Democratic Party organization formed by Daniel P. O'Connell, which wrested control of Albany city and county from the Republican organization led by William Barnes Jr. in the early 1920s.  The O'Connell machine proved so durable that it still largely controlled Albany County until the early 1980s, one of the last such organizations to remain viable.  Corning entered politics at an early age as an affiliate of the O'Connell organization, winning a seat in the New York State Assembly in 1935.  After serving in the Assembly during the 1936 legislative session, Corning won election to the New York State Senate, where he served from 1937 to 1941.  Corning was elected mayor in 1941.  He continued to win election every four years until 1981, and served from 1941 until his death in 1983.  Corning was drafted for World War II and served in the United States Army's 2nd Infantry Division during combat in Europe.  In 1946, he was the Democratic Party's unsuccessful nominee for lieutenant governor.  In the 1970s Corning teamed with Governor Nelson A. Rockefeller to finance construction of the Empire State Plaza, a large state government office complex near Albany's downtown area.  The plaza's tallest building,  Erastus Corning Tower, was named in Corning's honor.

In the early 1980s, Corning's health began to deteriorate.  In January, 1983 he was moved to University Hospital in Boston, where he died on May 28.  Corning was buried at Albany Rural Cemetery in Menands.  At slightly over 41 years, Corning's tenure makes him Albany's longest-serving mayor, as well as the longest-tenured mayor ever of any large city in the United States.

Early life
Erastus Corning 2nd was born in Albany, New York on October 7, 1909, the son of Louise Maxwell and Edwin Corning. Corning's mother was born to American parents in Cawnpore, India, where her father Allan was serving as a missionary. After the 1890 death of Allan Maxwell, her mother Ellen became a successful novelist and married U.S. Navy admiral Albert S. Barker.

Corning's father was from an Albany-area family prominent in business and politics. Corning was educated at The Albany Academy and Groton School. In 1928, he began attendance at Yale University. Corning graduated magna cum laude with a Bachelor of Arts degree in 1932 and was a member of the Chi Psi fraternity, Wolf's Head senior society, and Phi Beta Kappa academic honor society.

Early career
After graduating from college, Corning started an insurance company and soon entered politics. He was a member of the New York State Assembly (Albany Co., 1st D.) in 1936; and of the New York State Senate (30th D.) from 1937 to 1941, sitting in the 160th, 161st, 162nd and 163rd New York State Legislatures. He resigned his seat on August 1, 1941, to seek the Democratic nomination for Mayor of Albany.

Corning won the first of his 11 terms as mayor in November 1941, easily defeating the Republican candidate, Benjamin R. Hoff, by nearly 46,000 votes. Corning took office on January 1, 1942.

Shortly after his first term began, the newly elected Governor Thomas E. Dewey had the powerful Albany Democratic political machine, run by "Boss" Daniel P. O'Connell, investigated. The investigations proved largely unsuccessful and left Corning and O'Connell unscathed. This political machine proved to be one of the most durable in American history, even outlasting the Daley family machine in Chicago.

Military service

After having been previously classified as ineligible for military service during World War II, in 1944, Corning's draft status was changed and he was found eligible.  Opting not to apply for an officer's commission or specialty training in a field such as civil affairs, he joined the United States Army as a private. During his absence, Frank Harris, a member of the city council, served as acting mayor.

Corning underwent training as an Infantryman at Fort Dix, New Jersey, and Camp Blanding, Florida.  Assigned to the 38th Infantry Regiment, a unit of the 2nd Infantry Division, he arrived in France with his unit in October, 1944.  In France, Corning was initially attached to an organization that performed rebuilding duties in towns and villages that had been liberated from German occupation.  During late 1944 and early 1945, he took part in the Battle of the Bulge and the Western Allied invasion of Germany and attained the rank of private first class.

In the fall of 1945, Corning was discharged and returned to Albany.  His awards included the Combat Infantryman Badge, Bronze Star Medal, European-African-Middle Eastern Campaign Medal with two battle stars, World War II Victory Medal, Army Good Conduct Medal, and the Presidential Unit Citation, which was awarded to Corning's battalion.

Post-World War II career
At the New York state election, 1946, Corning ran for Lieutenant Governor of New York on the ticket with James M. Mead for governor, but they were defeated by the incumbent Republicans Dewey and Joe R. Hanley.

Corning served ten full consecutive terms as mayor after his return from the war. His insurance firm profited from being the sole bidder on Albany County insurance contracts for many years. Corning defended this apparent conflict of interest by noting that he himself was not a county official.

Corning was re-elected in landslides for most of his career.  The most notable exception was 1973 when a prominent businessman and reform candidate, Carl Touhey, ran a well-financed Republican campaign and came within 3,500 votes of defeating him. In 1977, Corning faced a primary election challenge from State Senator Howard C. Nolan Jr., defeating him by a comfortable margin.

Corning's last mayoral re-election came in 1981, when he defeated Charles Touhey (the son of 1973 mayoral candidate Carl Touhey) by a two-to-one margin. During his final term in office, his health deteriorated. He died in office in 1983.

Personal life
In 1932, Corning married Elizabeth Norris Platt (1912-1993).  They were the parents of two children, Erastus Corning III and Bettina Corning Dudley.

Corning's extended family was prominent in Albany-area business in politics for several generations.  In addition to his father Edwin, who served as lieutenant governor, Corning's family included: Erastus Corning (great-grandfather); Amasa J. Parker (great-grandfather); Parker Corning (uncle); and Edwin Corning Jr. (brother).

Dorothea "Polly" Noonan—a onetime secretary to Corning, a vice chairwoman of the Democratic State Committee, and a longtime president of the Albany Democratic Women's Club—was Corning's "closest confidante". According to author Paul Grondahl, the lives of Corning and Noonan were "'inextricably linked through politics and personal devotion'". Author William Kennedy recalled in his book “O Albany!” that at Corning's funeral, members of the media were asked not to "'focus undue attention'" on Noonan. According to The New York Times, Corning, "in effect, disinherited his wife and children. He left the Noonan family his insurance business, which generously sold policies to anyone who wanted to do business with the government".

Corning referred to himself as "Erastus Corning 2nd", preferring it to "Erastus Corning II" or "Erastus Corning Jr."

On May 28, 1983, following a year-long illness, Corning died of cardio-pulmonary failure at University Hospital in Boston. He is interred at Albany Rural Cemetery.

Legacy

The Erastus Corning Tower, the tallest building in Albany and the tallest in the state outside New York City, is named for him, as is the Corning Riverfront Park, a nature trail and fishing site on the western banks of the Hudson River in Albany. Some believe that the building was named after Corning because it has 42 floors (which is the same as the number of years he served as mayor), but the building actually has 44 floors with an observation deck on Floor 42. Completed in 1973, the skyscraper was dedicated to Corning upon his death in 1983.

Queen Wilhelmina of the Netherlands named Corning an officer of the Order of Orange-Nassau, the country's highest citizen honor, in gratitude for his aid to Nijmegen following World War II.

References

External links
Excerpt from Mayor Corning: Albany Icon, Albany Enigma by Paul Grondahl
Another excerpt from Mayor Corning: Albany Icon, Albany Enigma
Biography of Erastus Corning 2nd at Albany County Hall of Records
 

1909 births
1983 deaths
Burials at Albany Rural Cemetery
Groton School alumni
Mayors of Albany, New York
Democratic Party members of the New York State Assembly
Democratic Party New York (state) state senators
Politicians from Albany, New York
Yale University alumni
Officers of the Order of Orange-Nassau
20th-century American politicians
The Albany Academy alumni
United States Army personnel of World War II
United States Army soldiers
Corning family